Moya Doherty (born 1957, in Pettigo, County Donegal, Ireland) is a Dublin-raised Irish entrepreneur and the producer and co-founder of Riverdance.

Early life
Doherty was born in Pettigo, County Donegal, and raised in Dublin.  She attended Manor House School, Raheny.

Riverdance
Riverdance is a worldwide acclaimed theatrical phenomenon, which premiered in Dublin's Point Theatre in February 1995. Riverdance had started as a seven-minute interlude at the 1994 Eurovision Song Contest in Dublin, commissioned by Moya Doherty, who was the show's Executive Producer.

Business interests
Doherty is chair of the board of Irish public service broadcaster RTÉ. She was previously a director of television production company Tyrone Productions. She was a founding director of the independent national commercial radio station Radio Ireland (which later rebranded as Today FM). She is a member of the board of the Dublin Theatre Festival. She was formerly a member of the board of the Abbey Theatre.

Personal life
Doherty is married to co-founder of Riverdance, John McColgan, and she is regarded as one of the wealthiest women in Ireland, with an estimated fortune of £42 million.  McColgan and Doherty have two sons and lived for many years on an extensive property in the Baily region of Howth and having sold the main property, retained a 3-bedroom house with private access.

References

1957 births
People from County Donegal
20th-century Irish people
People educated at Manor House School, Raheny
Performers of Irish dance
21st-century Irish people
Living people